Elena Antonovna Kamburova (born July 11, 1940) is a Russian singer and actress. In addition to numerous solo albums, her voice is recorded in more than a hundred film soundtracks. She is a People's Artist of Russian Federation.

Born in Stalinsk, she was brought up in Ukraine where her family relocated. In 1967, she graduated from the State College of Circus and Variety Art (Государственное училище циркового и эстрадного искусства), and in 1979 from GITIS. 

In the 1960s, Kamburova participated in concerts and radio recordings.  She performed songs by Novella Matveyeva and Bulat Okudzhava. Okudzhava once noted that her art is "a lucky combination of voice, intellect, and talent.". From mid-1970s, compositions of Vladimir Dashkevich made up a significant part of her repertoire, based on the lyrics by Vladimir Mayakovsky, Alexander Blok and (unfavorable with the Soviet authorities) Marina Tsvetayeva, Anna Akhmatova and Osip Mandelstam.

In 1992, Kamburova founded The Moscow Theater of Music and Poetry, where she acts as the director, a performer and an actress.

Discography

LPs 
 Прощай, оружие (A Farewell to Arms - on motives of Ernest Hemingway, 1970)
 Поет Елена Камбурова (Elena Kamburova Sings, 1975)
 Сказки об Италии (Tales about Italy, 1981)
 Послушайте (Listen, 1982)
 Да осенит тишина (Let There Be Silence, 1987)

CDs 
 Дрёма (Dream - Russian lullabies, 1997)
 Капли Датского короля (The Mixture of Danish King, 1999)
 Волшебная скрипка (The Magic Violin, 1999)
 Синий троллейбус (Blue Trolleybus - songs by Bulat Okudzhava, 1999)
 Дорога (The Road, 2000)
 Любовь и разлука (Love and Separation, 2001)
 Песни из кинофильмов - 1 (Songs from Films - part 1, 2001)
 Песни из кинофильмов – 2 (Songs from Films - part 2, 2001)
 Романс о жизни и смерти (Romance of Life and Death, 2004)
 Воспоминание о шарманке (A Recollection about the Barrel-Organ - songs by Larissa Kritskaya, 2007)
 Реквием (Requiem of Anna Akhmatova, music by Vladimir Dashkevich, live, 2007)
 Концерт в театре "Школа современной пьесы" (Live in the School of Modern Play Theater, 2008)
 Концерт в театре Музыки и Поэзии (Live in the Theater of Music and Poetry, 2008, DVD)

Films 
 Hans Christian Andersen's The Little Mermaid - Marina (Singing voice in Matteo Hitto)
 The Adventures of the Elektronic - Syroyezhkin (Singing voice)

External links 
 Official site of the Theater of Music and Poetry
 Under Blue Sky Kamburova sings "Над твердью голубой..." (mp3, History of the song)
 Concert Концерт в Центральном Доме Художника
 Albums

In Russian 
 Bio at narod.ru
 Bio, links, interview at peoples.ru
 ЕЛЕНА КАМБУРОВА: ШТРИХИ К ТВОРЧЕСКОМУ ПОРТРЕТУ Алла ЦЫБУЛЬСКАЯ
 2005 interview at NI
 2005 interview at NG

1940 births
Living people
Russian actresses
Russian women singers
Russian people of Greek descent
People from Novokuznetsk